Bahaa Abdelmegid is an Egyptian writer. He obtained a PhD from Ain Shams University, where he now teaches in the English department. He is the author of several novels and short stories. Two of these have been translated into English: Temple Bar, translated by Jonathan Wright, and Saint Theresa, and Sleeping with Strangers, translated by Chip Rossetti.

References

Egyptian writers
Year of birth missing (living people)
Living people